The basketball tournaments of NCAA Season 91 were the Philippines' National Collegiate Athletic Association tournaments for the current season. The Mapua Institute of Technology hosted the season, started with an opening ceremony held on June 27, 2015, at the Mall of Asia Arena followed by a double-header. Games are expected to be followed at the Filoil Flying V Arena in San Juan, with two seniors and juniors games. The seniors' games are aired live by ABS-CBN Sports and Action and in High Definition on  Balls HD 167.

Seniors' tournament

Teams

Elimination round

Team standings

Match-up results

Scores

Seeding playoffs
The top 5 teams are separated by 1 game.
Letran and San Beda were tied for first and second; a playoff was held to determine which will be the #1 seed.
JRU, Mapua and Arellano were tied for third to fifth; a series of playoffs were held. JRU had the bye as the team with the best head-to-head record among the three:
Mapua and Arellano played for the #4 seed; the loser is eliminated; the winner advances to the third-seed playoff, and is guaranteed no less than a #4 seed
JRU waited for the third-seed playoff; the winner gets the #3 seed, while the loser is the #4 seed

First–seed playoff
Winner faces the #4 seed, while the loser faces the #3 seed. Both still have the twice-to-beat advantage in the semifinals.

Fourth–seed playoff
Winner advances to the third seed playoff and is guaranteed of no less than a #4 seed, while the loser is eliminated.

Third–seed playoff
Winner is the third seed, while the loser settles for the #4 seed.

Bracket

Game went into overtime

Semifinals
San Beda and Letran have the twice-to-beat advantage; they only have to win once, while their opponents twice, to advance to the Finals.

San Beda vs. JRU

Letran vs. Mapua

Finals
This is a best-of-three playoff.

Finals Most Valuable Player:

All-Star Game
The 10 member schools were divided into East and West. The East squad is represented by players from San Beda College, University of Perpetual Help, Arellano University, Jose Rizal University and San Sebastian College-Recoletos, while the West team draws from Lyceum of the Philippines University, Emilio Aguinaldo College, College of Saint Benilde, Mapua Institute of Technology, and Colegio de San Juan de Letran.

All-Star Game MVP: Jonathan Grey (CSB)

Side events winners
3-Point Shootout Champion: Mark Cruz (Letran)
Slam Dunk Champion: Jebb Bulawan (Lyceum)
Miss NCAA: Lyra Velchez (Perpetual)
 Miss NCAA 1st Runner-Up: Rycca Timog (Lyceum)
 Miss NCAA 2nd Runner-Up: Zahara Soriano (Arellano)

Awards
The awards were given prior to Game 1 of the Seniors' basketball finals on October 23, 2015, at the Mall of Asia Arena.
Most Valuable Player:  
Rookie of the Year:   
Mythical Five:
 
  
 
 
  
All-Defensive Team:
  
 
 
 
 
Defensive Player of the Year:  
Most Improved Player: 
Coach of the Year:

Broadcast notes

Finals
Simulcast over ABS-CBN Sports and Action, The Filipino Channel or ABS-CBN Sports and Action International, and Balls HD 195 with replays on Balls and Balls HD 195.

Additional Game 3 crew:
 Award presenter: Andrei Felix

Juniors' tournament

Elimination round

Team standings

Match-up results

Scores

Fourth–seed playoff

Bracket

Stepladder semifinals
The semifinals consists of two rounds of single-elimination.

First round

Second round

Finals
Since San Beda swept the elimination round, the Finals is a de facto best of five series with San Beda automatically leading 1–0. Therefore,  San Beda has to win twice, while Arellano needed thrice, to win the championship.

Finals Most Valuable Player:

Awards
Most Valuable Player: 
Mythical Five:

Defensive Player of the Year: 
Rookie of the Year: 
Most Improved Player: 
Coach of the Year:

Controversies

Wrong uniform
The NCAA Management Committee, chaired by Melchor Divina of Mapua, upheld the recommendation of commissioner Arturo Cristobal forfeiting La Salle-Greenhills’ 88–49 victory over Letran. LSGH's Jesmar Pedrosa, Alain Madrigal and Ladis Lepalam wore Nos. 20, 28 and 27, respectively, which violated a league rule limiting the use of jersey numbers to Nos. 4 to 19.

See also 
 UAAP Season 78 basketball tournaments

References

External links
Official website

90
2015–16 in Philippine college basketball